Thylacoptila paurosema is a species of moth of the family Pyralidae. It has a wide range and is found on the Canary Islands, Cabo Verde, Ethiopia, Ghana, Réunion, Saudi Arabia, Sierra Leone, Sudan, Namibia, South Africa, Yemen, Madagascar, Indonesia, Burma, Malaysia, Pakistan, Sri Lanka, India and Ascension Island.

The larvae are a pest of cashew and mango.

References

Moths described in 1888
Phycitini
Moths of Madagascar
Insects of Namibia
Moths of Africa